Cricket in Russia is a sport played at the amateur, club, intercollegiate, and international competition levels.

Russia has a national team for international cricket. In 2012, they were officially endorsed by the International Cricket Council (ICC) as an Affiliate member In April 2018, the ICC decided to grant full Twenty20 International (T20I) status to all its members. Therefore, all Twenty20 matches played between Russia and other ICC Members after 1 January 2019 will be a full T20I.

History
The game was played in St. Petersburg as early as the 1870s. In 1875, the British inhabitants of the city tested the mariners of the Prince of Wales' Royal Yacht Osbourne in a match. The Communist Revolution of 1917 put paid to the spread of cricket in Russia as it was viewed as an activity of the "middle class" and playing it was deprecated. With the British moving out of St. Petersburg following the Revolution, the game rapidly disappeared with them.

By 1995 cricket was played again in Russia, where two groups made up of expatriates took part in a friendly match. In 2004 the United Cricket League was registered as a lawful entity, presently renamed Cricket Russia. Cricket Russia is the main enrolled National Governing Body for Cricket in Russia. The Russia national cricket team played their first home representative match against a touring side from North Wales, Carmel and District Cricket Club, at the Moscow State University Baseball Stadium in 2007. Cricket in Russia is recognised by the Multisport Association of Russia; this is the relationship for all sporting governing associations inside Russia which are not yet Olympic sports. In 2012 Cricket Russia joined the ICC.

In July 2019, cricket was not included on Russia's list of official sports. It meant that Cricket Russia did not receive government funding over the year. However, in May 2020, the Russian Government reversed its decision, recognising cricket as a sport, and therefore eligible for funding.

References

 
Sport in Russia by sport